Since his debut in Sgt. Fury and his Howling Commandos #1 (May 1963), the Marvel Comics superhero Nick Fury has appeared in many different forms of media, including films, television programs and video games.

Television

1990s

Live action 
 David Hasselhoff portrays Nick Fury in the 1998 Fox television movie Nick Fury: Agent of S.H.I.E.L.D.

Animated 
 Nick Fury appeared as a guest character in Iron Man, voiced by Philip Abbott.
 Nick Fury appeared in episodes of Spider-Man, initially voiced by Philip Abbott and later by Jack Angel. He confronts the identity-changing terrorist the Chameleon in the episodes "Day of the Chameleon", "The Cat", and "The Black Cat". He also appears in the "Six Forgotten Warriors" six-part episode.
 Nick Fury appeared in X-Men: The Animated Series. In the season two episode "Time Fugitives Part I", he watched Graydon Creed's speech blaming the mutants as virus carriers inside S.H.I.E.L.D. headquarters with G.W. Bridge and War Machine. In the season five episode "Old Soldiers", he is seen with his World War II band of Howling Commandos.
 Nick Fury appears in the Spider-Man Unlimited episode "Worlds Apart", voiced by Mark Gibbon. He tries to stop Spider-Man from taking a shuttle. When Spider-Man states that he is going to Counter-Earth to rescue John Jameson, Nick Fury allows him to take the shuttle.

2000s 
 Nick Fury is featured in X-Men: Evolution, voiced by Jim Byrnes. While he is shown to have connections with Wolverine (Logan), later episodes had him releasing Bolivar Trask from prison under orders of his superiors to help deal with the threat of Apocalypse. When Wolverine commented about Nick reviving the Sentinel project, Fury stated that it wasn't his choice to make. This show marks the last time that the character was depicted in animation as Caucasian; later appearances have modeled the character after Samuel L. Jackson as in the Ultimate Marvel comics and the Marvel Cinematic Universe movies.
 A Nick Fury TV series was considered for development in 2001.
 Nick Fury appears in Wolverine and the X-Men, voiced by Alex Désert. This version is an amalgam of the Earth-616 version and the Earth-1610 version. His patch is on the right eye, and not the left as in most iterations. In the episode "Wolverine vs. The Hulk", he uses his connections to call off the Mutant Response Division's attack on Wolverine who he persuaded to head to Canada to deal with the Hulk by mentioning that he obtained info on who each of the X-Men are. After Wolverine and Hulk defeated the Wendigoes, Wolverine scolds Fury about the Wendigoes being part of an attempt at a super-soldier program. Wolverine then punches Bruce Banner so that Hulk can "thank Fury." After Hulk throws Wolverine a distance, Wolverine quotes "Have fun Fury."
 Nick Fury appears in Iron Man: Armored Adventures, voiced by Dean Redman. 
 Nick Fury appears in The Super Hero Squad Show, voiced by Kevin Michael Richardson.

2010s

Animation 
 Alex Desert reprises his role in The Avengers: Earth's Mightiest Heroes. This version initially appears as the Director of S.H.I.E.L.D., but leaves the position to investigate an invasion by the Skrulls. While this version is depicted as African-American, his season one design is patterned after the character's classic look, while his season two design is based on Samuel L. Jackson.
 Alex Desert also voices the animated debut of Jack Fury. In addition to being depicted as African-American, this version takes his son's place in the Howling Commandos. 
 Chi McBride voices Nick Fury in Ultimate Spider-Man, and would later reprise his role in Avengers Assemble, Phineas and Ferb: Mission Marvel, Hulk and the Agents of S.M.A.S.H., and Lego Marvel Super Heroes: Maximum Overload.
 Nick Fury appears in Marvel Disk Wars: The Avengers, voiced by Hisao Egawa in Japanese and John Eric Bentley in English.

Film

Live-action 
 In the audio commentary of Fantastic Four: Rise of the Silver Surfer, director Tim Story said the script originally contained Nick Fury, but the role eventually became that of General Hager (played by Andre Braugher), as having Nick Fury would have forced Fox to purchase that character's rights; some of Hager's lines in the film originate from Nick Fury in Ultimate Extinction.

Animation 
 Andre Ware voiced Nick Fury's Ultimate version in the direct-to-video animated features Ultimate Avengers (2006) and Ultimate Avengers 2 (2008).
 Nick Fury appears in the film Iron Man: Rise of Technovore, voiced by John Eric Bentley in English and Hideaki Tezuka in Japanese.
 Nick Fury appears in the anime film Avengers Confidential: Black Widow & Punisher, with John Eric Bentley reprising the role.

Marvel Cinematic Universe 

Samuel L. Jackson signed a nine-film contract with Marvel to portray Nick Fury in the Marvel Cinematic Universe. Jackson has also confirmed that 2019's Captain Marvel marked the end of his nine-film contract with Marvel. However, he continued to portray the character in Avengers: Endgame and Spider-Man: Far From Home. Additionally, Jackson reprises his role in guest appearances in two episodes of Agents of S.H.I.E.L.D. and will reprise the role in the Disney+ series What If...? and Secret Invasion. In August 2020, actor Jeff Ward revealed that Agents of S.H.I.E.L.D. series writer DJ Doyle had pitched a post-credits scene for the Agents of S.H.I.E.L.D. series finale that was not shot, that featured Ward's character Deke Shaw (introduced in the fifth season) sitting in a S.H.I.E.L.D. office in the alternate timeline he ends the series trapped in, serving as the organization's Director and wearing an eye patch. Ward added, since it was unclear if the alternate timeline's Nick Fury was still alive in the alternate timeline following the events of the seventh season, Deke would have worn it because it felt like "a power and cool thing", with Deke ultimately serving as a partial adaptation of the original version of the character.

Video games 
 Nick Fury appears in two The Punisher games:
 Nick Fury was the second player's character in the arcade game The Punisher.
 Nick Fury appears as a non-playable character in 2005 video game The Punisher. Several of his S.H.I.E.L.D. agents are featured in a later level, Voiced by Steve Blum.
 Nick Fury is featured in the 2005 video game adaptation of Fantastic Four, voiced by Andre Ware.
 Nick Fury appears in X-Men Legends II: Rise of Apocalypse, voiced by Khary Payton.
 Nick Fury appears in many Spider-Man games. Most of these appearances are based on his Ultimate Marvel incarnation:
 The Ultimate version of Nick Fury appears in the Ultimate Spider-Man video game, voiced by Dave Fennoy.
 Nick Fury appears as a non-playable character in the video game Spider-Man: Friend or Foe, voiced by Marc Graue. At the start of the game, he rescues Spider-Man from the P.H.A.N.T.O.M.s and recruits him into S.H.I.E.L.D. to help find the P.H.A.N.T.O.M.s' creator and stop them. He briefs Spider-Man and his team at the beginning of their missions. A running gag in the game is that Fury tends to deal with the antics of the Helicarrier's computer.
 Nick Fury appears in the PSP and PS2 versions of Spider-Man: Web of Shadows.
 The Ultimate version of Nick Fury is mentioned in the final Ultimate segment of Spider-Man: Shattered Dimensions. He ordered his scientists not to experiment with the fragment of the Tablet of Order and Chaos that they found, but they ended up doing so anyway, and tried fusing it with Carnage, which allowed him to absorb the fragment's power and break free. Fury called Spider-Man for assistance, but by the time he arrives, most of the Triskellion is already under Carnage's control, and S.H.I.E.L.D. agents are struggling to fight his offsprings. Fury is mentioned by Spider-Man several times throughout the level
 Nick Fury appears in the Spider-Man Unlimited video game and would later be made a playable character, voiced by John Eric Bentley. 
 Nick Fury is a recurring character in Marvel: Ultimate Alliance series:
 Nick Fury appears in Marvel: Ultimate Alliance voiced by Scott MacDonald. When Doctor Doom's Masters of Evil attacks the S.H.I.E.L.D. Helicarrier U.N.N. Alpha, he sends a distress signal to all heroes to come defend the Helicarrier. He is a playable character after completing the game for the first time. He has two costumes based on the mainstream Marvel universe version and two costumes based on the Ultimate Marvel iteration.
 Nick Fury appears in Marvel: Ultimate Alliance 2, voiced by David Kaye. His role in Secret War is intact, but he resurfaces when it comes to the Fold and has the heroes evacuate from Negative Zone Prison Alpha so that he can have it self-destruct. When the heroes are in Wakanda, it was discovered that Nick has been absorbed into the Fold. In the final battle, Fury attacks the heroes in his Nanite form using the powers of Electro, Havok, Multiple Man, Firestar, Bishop, and A-Bomb. In both endings, a banner shown across the news reports states that Fury has been pardoned by the President. Upon completing the game, his Nanite form is unlocked as a playable character. 
 Nick Fury Jr. (rather than Nick Fury Sr.) appears in a different continuity depicted in Marvel Ultimate Alliance 3: The Black Order albeit as a NPC. John Bentley reprises the role.
 Nick Fury appears in the video game adaption of Iron Man 2, voiced by Samuel L. Jackson with additional dialogue provided by John Eric Bentley.
 Nick Fury's Ultimate version appears in Crimson Viper's ending for Marvel vs. Capcom 3: Fate of Two Worlds where he offers a job with S.H.I.E.L.D. He later reappeared in Ultimate ending of Captain America, in taking Barack Obama's place from original version.
 Two versions of Nick Fury appear as playable characters in Marvel Super Hero Squad Online: one based on his appearance in The Super Hero Squad Show animated series, and one based on Samuel L. Jackson's portrayal in the 2012 film The Avengers.
 Nick Fury appears as a non-playable character in the Facebook game Marvel: Avengers Alliance.
 Nick Fury appears in every Lego Marvel games:
 Nick Fury appears in Lego Marvel Super Heroes, voiced by John Bentley. The DS version features the original version as "Nick Fury Sr.".
 Nick Fury appears in Marvel Cinematic Universe-themed Lego Marvel's Avengers. While the game mainly reuses voice clips from the films it is based, Samuel L. Jackson returned to record several new lines.
 Nick Fury appears in Lego Marvel Super Heroes 2, voiced by Chris Jarman.
 Nick Fury appears as a non-playable character in Marvel Heroes, voiced by Keith David.
 Nick Fury is a non-playable character in Marvel Avengers Alliance Tactics.
 Nick Fury is a playable character in Disney Infinity: Marvel Super Heroes (2.0 Edition) and Disney Infinity 3.0, with Samuel L. Jackson reprising his role.
 Nick Fury is a playable character in Marvel Puzzle Quest.
 Nick Fury is a playable character in Marvel: Future Fight mobile game.
 Nick Fury is a playable character in Marvel Mighty Heroes.
 Nick Fury appears extensively, and is a playable (though rather difficult to obtain) character in Marvel Strike Force.
 Nick Fury appears as a playable characters in Marvel Contest of Champions.
 Nick Fury plays a supporting role in Iron Man VR, voiced by Ike Amadi. He knew Tony Stark from before he became Iron Man, as Stark Industries would often sell weapons to S.H.I.E.L.D., including the Helicarrier. After Stark announced that his company would stop manufacturing weapons, Fury and Stark's relationship was strained, but they nonetheless continue to respect and admire each other. Fury first appears when he calls Iron Man to the Helicarrier to provide intel about Ghost, just as the villain attacks, but Iron Man helps S.H.I.E.L.D. fend her off. At the end of the game, Fury calls Iron Man and Rescue into space to examine a S.H.I.E.L.D. orbital satellite that has become suspiciously unresponsive.
 Nick Fury appears in the 2020 Avengers game, voiced by Charles Parnell. Once an ally of the Avengers and the director of S.H.I.E.L.D., he disappeared without trace after the agency was forced to go underground as a result of the "A-Day" tragedy. Before his disappearance, Fury hid copies of resources and protocols to enable S.H.I.E.L.D. to rebuild itself. It is revealed in DLC expansion that Nick Fury is alive and currently being sent by Monica to the future where Kree invaded Earth. He tasked Hawkeye to find him in that timeline, then inform their allies of the Kree’s upcoming invasion which about to be occurred in the present. Sometimes after Avengers retrieves the Cosmic Cube from Monica’s hand and prevent Future Imperfect (where Hawkeye, Taskmaster and Hulk (Maestro in that timeline) survives) from happening in their timeline, as well as their alliance with Wakandan forces, Nick Fury returns to lead S.H.I.E.L.D. once more.
 Nick Fury appears in the 2021 Marvel Future Revolution game, with John Bentley reprising his role from various Marvel media.

Live performance 
Nick Fury appears in the Marvel Universe: LIVE! arena show.

Novels 
Nick Fury is the main character in the novel Nick Fury, Agent of S.H.I.E.L.D.: Empyre.
 Nick Fury appears in the prose novel adaptation of the event comic The Death of Captain America.

Web series 
Nick Fury appears in several episodes of the stop-motion animated web series Marvel Superheroes: What the--?!.

References